Martin Zach (4 January 1933 – 27 September 2008) was a German ice hockey player. He competed in the men's tournament at the 1956 Winter Olympics.

References

External links
 

1933 births
2008 deaths
Olympic ice hockey players of Germany
Olympic ice hockey players of the United Team of Germany
Ice hockey players at the 1956 Winter Olympics
People from Bad Tölz
Sportspeople from Upper Bavaria